Witcher Creek is a tributary of the Kanawha River,  long, in West Virginia in the United States.
 
Witcher Creek flows for its entire length in eastern Kanawha County. The creek is paralleled by a county road for much of its course.
 
According to the Geographic Names Information System, Witcher Creek has also been known historically by the variant name “Witchers Creek.”

See also
List of rivers of West Virginia

References 

Rivers of West Virginia
Rivers of Kanawha County, West Virginia
Tributaries of the Kanawha River